Baliochila nyasae is a butterfly in the family Lycaenidae. It is found in Malawi (from the southern part of the country to the Mlanje district).

References

Butterflies described in 1953
Poritiinae
Endemic fauna of Malawi
Butterflies of Africa